The Cate or Adams House is a historic house at the northwest corner of Court and Pleasant streets in Castine, Maine.  Built in 1815 during the height of the town's prosperity, it is a fine local example of a Federal period house.  It was built for Thomas Adams, a local politician, and was for a time the residence of author Harriet Beecher Stowe.  It was listed on the National Register of Historic Places in 1970.

Description and history
The Cate House is a -story wood-frame structure, five bays wide, with a side-gable roof and twin interior chimneys.  Its main entry centered on the main (east-facing) facade, has sidelight windows and a semi-elliptical fanlight window.  A two-story ell extends to the rear.  The interior has a central hall plan, with an elegant carved stairway and a unique curved door.

The house was built in 1815, during the height of Castine's prosperity as a maritime center after the War of 1812.  The house was built for Thomas and Jane (Russell) Adams; he was a local selectman and served in the state legislature.  Their daughter Jane married Charles Cate, and they were the house's next owners.  Their daughter Anna married Sanford B. Dole, a leading figure in late-19th century Hawaiian politics.  Harriet Beecher Stowe is known to have stayed here during a visit to Castine.  At the time of the property's listing on the National Register in 1970, the house was owned by the Maine Maritime Academy, and served as housing for its executive officer.

See also
National Register of Historic Places listings in Hancock County, Maine

References

Houses on the National Register of Historic Places in Maine
Colonial architecture in the United States
Houses completed in 1815
Houses in Hancock County, Maine
National Register of Historic Places in Hancock County, Maine
Historic district contributing properties in Maine